The canton of Chelles is a French administrative division, located in the arrondissement of Torcy, in the Seine-et-Marne département (Île-de-France région).

Demographics

Composition 
Since the French canton reorganisation which came into effect in March 2015, the canton consists of the commune of Chelles.

See also
Cantons of the Seine-et-Marne department
Communes of the Seine-et-Marne department

References

Chelles